The Women's skeet event at the 2010 South American Games was held on March 25 at 9:00.

Medalists

Results

Qualification

Final

References
Qualification
Final

Skeet W